The Dallara GP2/05 is an open-wheel formula racing car, developed by Italian chassis manufacturer Dallara, for use in the GP2 Series, a feeder series for Formula One. The GP2/05 was the first 1st-generation car used by the GP2 Series. The GP2/05 was used from 2005 to 2007, in keeping with the series philosophy of introducing a chassis every three years. As the GP2 Series is a spec-formula, the car was utilised by all teams and drivers in the championship.

History 
The car had its initial shakedown at the Circuit Paul Ricard on 16 July 2004 by Franck Montagny. Another test was held on the Barcelona circuit in November 2004. The old Formula 3000 cars, the Lola B02/50, also participated in the test. The times of the two different types of cars were similar, but this was due to an accident in the first laps, which forced Montagny to limit the use of the car. The first collective test was held between 23 and 25 February 2005, again on the Paul Ricard Circuit.

The car was updated for the 2007 season, without however providing for the installation of the push to pass button, tested in 2006.

References

GP2 Series
Dallara racing cars